Jordan Michael Lee (born 31 December 1996) is an English professional footballer who plays as a defender for Bournemouth.

Club career

Bournemouth
After starting his career with Premier League side Bournemouth, Lee made his debut in an FA Cup third round tie against Birmingham City. Lee featured up until the 84th minute, after he was replaced by Steve Cook in the 2–1 victory. On 7 January 2017, Lee made his second appearance for Bournemouth once again in an FA Cup tie. The game resulted in a 3–0 defeat against League One side Millwall, in which Lee featured for 45 mins before being replaced by Steve Cook.

He had his contract cancelled by the club in February 2018 by mutual consent. http://www.bournemouthecho.co.uk/sport/16031260.Carl_Fletcher_tips_departed_pair_Jordan_Lee_and_Callum_Stanton_for_bright_futures/

Torquay United (loan)
On 13 January 2017, Lee joined National League side Torquay United on loan for the remainder of the 2016–17 campaign.

On 24 July 2017, Lee returned to Torquay United on loan for a second time until January 2018.

Career statistics

References

External links

1996 births
Living people
English footballers
Association football defenders
AFC Bournemouth players
Torquay United F.C. players
National League (English football) players